Tuctubamba or Tuqtubamba (possibly from Quechua tuqtu broody hen, pampa a large plain, "broody hen plain") is a  mountain in the Cordillera Blanca in the Andes of Peru. It is situated in the Ancash Region, at the border of the Mariscal Luzuriaga Province, Lucma District, the Pomabamba Province, Huayllán District, and the Yungay Province, Yanama District. Tuctubamba lies southeast of Taulliraju.

See also 
 Sintiru
 Tawlliqucha
 Yuraqmayu

References

Mountains of Ancash Region
Mountains of Peru